Alfred Meredith Filipaina  is a New Zealand politician who is an Auckland Councillor.

Biography
From the mid 1980s until 1997, Filipaina worked as a community constable in Māngere Bridge.

Political career

Filipaina was a Manukau City Councillor prior to the 'Super City' merger of Auckland's councils into Auckland Council in 2010.

In the inaugural 2010 Auckland Council elections Filipaina was elected from the Manukau ward. He was re-elected in 2013 and 2016. In 2016 the new mayor, Phil Goff, appointed him deputy chairperson of the environment and communities committee.

In the 2022 New Year Honours, Filipaina was appointed a Member of the New Zealand Order of Merit, for services to the New Zealand Police and the community.

Personal life
Filipaina's father was an overstayer, who narrowly avoided deportation during the dawn raids. One of Filipaina's brothers, Olsen, represented the New Zealand national rugby league team in rugby league. Another, Jerry, once stood for The Family Party in 2008.

References

Living people
Auckland Councillors
New Zealand Labour Party politicians
New Zealand people of Samoan descent
Māori politicians
Manukau City Councillors
Year of birth missing (living people)
Members of the New Zealand Order of Merit
New Zealand police officers